Snow Hill, West Virginia may refer to:
Snow Hill, Kanawha County, West Virginia, an unincorporated community in Kanawha County
Snow Hill, Nicholas County, West Virginia, an unincorporated community in Nicholas County